Haikou Bay is a bay on the northern coast of Hainan Province, China, in the Qiongzhou Strait. It is named for Haikou City, which is situated on the coast.

This shallow bay spans approximately 12 km from its eastern boundary at the northwestern tip of Haidian Island to its western boundary roughly at Hainan International Convention And Exhibition Center.

Features
Within the bay are the following from west to east:
Holiday Beach
Nanhai Pearl Artificial Island, an under-construction island owned by HNA Group off the coast of Holiday Beach
Haikou Xiuying Port
The northern edge of Haikou City
Evergreen Park, a large park on the coast
Mayard International Yacht Club
The mouth of the Haidian River

Land reclamation
Part of the western edge of Haidian Island is being extended in a major land reclamation project. Also, several new areas of land off the coast of Haikou are being created, including the Nanhai Pearl Artificial Island.

References

Bays of Hainan
Haikou